Vladimir Minashkin (also Minachkin, ; 1928–2000) was a Russian breaststroke swimmer. Between 1953 and 1957 he set eight world records, four in the 100 m breaststroke and four in the 4×100 m medley relay. He also broke a European record in the 200 m breaststroke in 1954 and won a gold medal at the 1958 European Aquatics Championships in the medley relay.

Nationally, between 1953 and 1959 he won six championships and set 13 records (USSR). In the 1990s, until 1998, he competed in the masters category and set 20 national records (Russia).

References

1928 births
2000 deaths
Russian male swimmers
World record setters in swimming
Male breaststroke swimmers
European Aquatics Championships medalists in swimming